Sant'Ugo  is a 20th-century parochial church and titular church in the northern suburbs of Rome, dedicated to Saint Hugh of Châteauneuf (1053–1132).

History 

Sant'Ugo was built in 1989–91.

On 26 November 1994, it was made a titular church to be held by a cardinal-priest.

Centro Aletti mosaics depicting the deesis were added in 2000.

Cardinal-Protectors
Emmanuel Wamala (1994–present)

References

External links

Titular churches
Roman Catholic churches completed in 1983
20th-century Roman Catholic church buildings in Italy